Powell's Books is a chain of bookstores in Portland, Oregon, and its surrounding metropolitan area. Powell's headquarters, dubbed Powell's City of Books, claims to be the largest independent new and used bookstore in the world. Powell's City of Books is located in the Pearl District on the edge of downtown and occupies a full city block between NW 10th and 11th Avenues and between W. Burnside and NW Couch Streets. In 2016, CNN rated it one of the "coolest" bookstores in the world.

The City of Books has nine color-coded rooms and over 3,500 different sections.
The inventory for its retail and online sales is over four million new, used, rare, and out-of-print books.  As of 2009, Powell's was buying around 3,000 used books a day.

History

20th century
Powell's was founded by Walter Powell in 1971. His son, Michael Powell, had started a bookstore in Chicago, Illinois, in 1970 which specialized in used, rare, and discounted books, primarily of an academic and scholarly nature. In 1979, Michael Powell joined his father in Portland, right after his father's store was not offered a lease renewal; within a year, they found the location that became its current headquarters. Michael bought the bookstore from his father in 1982.

In 1984, Powell's opened its first branch store, in a suburban shopping center named Loehmann's Plaza (later renamed Cascade Plaza), near Washington Square. The new branch was not a replica of its City of Books location; Powell was concerned that the "edgy" neighborhood of its headquarters location was limiting its customer base, so the new store was "fairly fancy" with white shelving, a tile floor, and banners over the aisles.  It was also four times the size of the typical chain bookstore.

A travel bookstore was established in 1985 on Pioneer Courthouse Square, and other stores followed, one a year for the next few years. By the early 1990s, Powell's bookstores were part of the resurgence of the independent bookstore, which collectively made 32 percent of book sales in the U.S. The travel store closed in 2005.

Powell's established its Internet presence in 1993, beginning with email and FTP-based access to its technical bookstore; it has since expanded to incorporate fiction and other genres as a traditional ecommerce site.  Their website was established in 1994, before Amazon.com, and has contributed substantially to the chain's recent growth.

The City of Books location grew to its current size after an expansion that opened in 1999; it included a new entrance facing the Pearl District which featured the "Pillar of Books", a Tenino sandstone carving depicting a stack of eight of the world's great books, on a base with the inscription  "Buy the book, read the book, enjoy the book, sell the book" in Latin. For the year ending June 2000, Powell's revenue was $41.8 million.

21st century

In 2002, Powell's was cited by USA Today as one of America's 10 best bookstores.

In January 2008, Powell's announced plans to expand the downtown City of Books by adding as many as two floors to the store's southeast corner.  The expansion was due to add at least  of new retail space.  Plans submitted to the Portland Design Commission in November 2008 called for a rooftop garden atop the new addition and an "art cube" over a redesigned main entrance.

In March 2010, Michael Powell confirmed plans to hand over management of the business to his daughter Emily as of July.  That same month, Powell's announced it would close its technical bookstore on the North Park Blocks, moving its sections on math, science, computing, engineering, construction and transportation into "Powell's Books Building 2" at the corner of 10th and Couch Street, near the main City of Books location; the consolidation was in response to a five-year decline in brick-and-mortar sales of technical books in favor of online sales.

In October 2010, Powell's announced it had bought 7,000 books from the library of author Anne Rice; Powell's offered these association copies on their website. The bookstore was revealed as a charter member of the Google eBooks service when the news was announced by Google on December 6, 2010.

In June 2011, Powell's participated in Google Offers during that service's first month of operation; according to TechCrunch—which characterized Powell's as a "Portland institution"—"5,000 Powell’s vouchers sold out in a matter of hours", making it "most popular deal in the month."

Starting in May 2012, Powell's began offering access to print on demand books via the Espresso Book Machine.

In early 2013, Emily Powell announced that Miriam Sontz, the company's chief operating officer, would take over as chief executive officer.

In late 2014, "Powell's Books Building 2" was closed and the technical books at that location were moved into the main City of Books location.

CEO Miriam Sontz retired in January 2019. Emily Powell remains president and owner.

Labor relations
In 1991, following some post-holiday lay-offs, some of Powell's employees formed an organizing committee, seeking to become part of the Oregon Public Employees Union (OPEU).  They got more than 35% of the employees to sign union cards but chose not to file for a union certification election because less than 65% had signed, a threshold suggested by the OPEU.  In response to issues identified by the organizing employees, Powell's updated and expanded its employee handbook in April 1992 with changes that addressed processes for problem solving and grievances, the probation and termination procedure, and other employee assistance, among other changes.

In September 1998, email from Powell's managers announcing reductions in employee's wage increases prompted the creation of a new organizing committee of 26 employees.  They chose the International Longshore and Warehouse Union (ILWU) because they could charter their own self-governing local union which would include about 350 employees serving in a variety of jobs in all stores and in the Internet, corporate, and shipping departments. By March 1999, they filed for a union certification election with the National Labor Relations Board. A month later, by a vote of 161–155, ILWU Local 5 became official.

In September 1999, ILWU Local 5 met for the first time with Powell's management, to begin the contract bargaining process.  After some early successes, 2000 saw a slowdown in the discussions, followed by rallies, filings of unfair labor practices, an unsuccessful decertification campaign, a one-day shutdown of the shipping department (accompanied by the slashing of a van's tire), and federal mediation.  A three-year contract was finally announced in August 2000.

In February 2011 Powell's announced the layoffs of 31 employees, over 7% of its unionized workforce, in “response to the unprecedented, rapidly changing nature of the book industry". It was the first round of layoffs since the store's workers formed a union. A union representative said that Powell's had reduced its workforce by about 40 in the prior year through attrition, but felt that layoffs were still necessary because of a decline in sales of new books and a rise in health care costs.

In response to the COVID-19 pandemic, Powell's announced the closing of its five locations and the termination of nearly all employees in mid-March 2020. The letter released by CEO Emily Powell on March 17, 2020, did not disclose the exact number of employees that were laid off. However, roughly 85% of the 400 members of the company's unionized workforce were terminated. More than 100 former staffers were then rehired to fulfill a large surge of online orders, but the union pointed out that only 49 were union-represented, and that the rest were managers who were now doing front-line work normally done by represented employees. In July 2020, Powell's announced that the store and kiosk in the Portland International Airport would remain closed permanently.

As Powell's gradually began re-hiring staff beginning in April 2021, former employees were forced to apply for open positions as new employees. Powell's claimed that their right to return to their old jobs had expired, and an agreement to extend those rights (and maintain previous pay levels) had not been reached between Powell's and the union. The majority of hired staff have been previous employees.

Politics 
Powell's Books was a key opponent of Oregon's Measure 97, which would have raised corporate taxes to fund schools, healthcare and senior services. Michael Powell contributed $25,000 to the opposition campaign. Powell's Books was featured in television ads for the No campaign, and Emily Powell signed a statement opposing the measure in the voter's pamphlet.

List of locations 

In addition to its "City of Books" location (1005 W Burnside St, Portland, OR 97209), Powell's Books has the following smaller locations: 

A store in Portland's Hawthorne District (3723 SE Hawthorne Blvd, Portland, OR 97214). Another location focused on cooking and gardening materials was located two spaces east; it was announced in January 2016 that Powell's would expand into the intermediary space and combine the two stores into one, with larger children's books and authors' event sections.
A  general bookstore with the "largest children's book section of any book store on the West Coast", located at Cedar Hills Crossing in Beaverton (3415 SW Cedar Hills Blvd, Beaverton, OR 97005) and opened in November 2006, replacing a 22-year-old location near Washington Square that was less than half the size.
A small corner of the Condon Local in Condon, Oregon (201 S Main St, Condon, OR 97823) consisting of 12 bookshelves. The outpost was started in 1993 by Michael Powell after discussions with Darla Seale, the then-owner of the Condon Local (then called Country Flowers).

See also

 Cameron's Books and Magazines

References

External links 

Powell's website, including a tour of the City of Books

1971 establishments in Oregon
American companies established in 1971
Antiquarian booksellers
Book selling websites
Bookstores established in the 20th century
Companies based in Portland, Oregon
Ebook suppliers
Independent bookstores of the United States
Internet properties established in 1993
Online retailers of the United States
Pearl District, Portland, Oregon
Privately held companies based in Oregon
Retail companies established in 1971